Maravić is a surname found in Serbia and Croatia.

Notable people with the surname include:

Dušan Maravić, Serbian footballer
Marko Maravić, Slovenian basketball player

See also
Maravich

Serbian surnames